Max Walter Reis (מקס רייס)(1927-2014) is a chemical engineer who was President of the Technion – Israel Institute of Technology from 1986–1990.

Biography
Reis attended Imperial College London, where he obtained a PhD. in chemical engineering. Reis was President of the Technion – Israel Institute of Technology from 1986–1990.

References 

Academic staff of Technion – Israel Institute of Technology
Technion – Israel Institute of Technology presidents
Alumni of Imperial College London
Israeli chemical engineers
2014 deaths
1927 births